Suleika Ibáñez Iglesias (8 December 1930 – 7 March 2013) was a Uruguayan writer, teacher, and translator.

Biography
Suleika Ibáñez was born in Montevideo on 8 December 1930, the daughter of poets  and Sara de Ibáñez. Her siblings were the writers  and Solveig Ibáñez. She was married to plastic artist Vladimiro Collazo, and was the mother of writer Marcia Collazo. Another daughter, Galia, died at a young age, and Ibáñez dedicated the 2002 book Galia, con quien tanto quería to her.

She received awards in contests by Givré (Buenos Aires, 1976),  (1985), and the newspaper La Hora (1986). In 1989, the  awarded her two first prizes in poetry and narrative. That year, she and  shared a dramaturgy prize from the publishing house . In 1998, she won first prize from Uruguay's Academia Nacional de Letras with an essay on Juana de Ibarbourou, and an honorable mention from the Biblioteca Nacional for an essay on César Vallejo. In 2010, she received the Cultural Career Award, during the Poets of the Two Shores Congress in Punta del Este, from the publishing house Botella al Mar.

Suleika Ibáñez died in Montevideo on 7 March 2013.

Selected works

 1975 – Herrera y Reissig, su vida y obra
 1985 – Feliz Año Nuevo (play)
 1989 – Homenaje a Jean Genet (Nuestra Señora de las Flores)
 1990 – Retrato de bellos y de bestias
 1991 – El Jardín de las Delicias
 1993 – Experiencias con ángeles y demonios
 1998 – La hija del molinero y otros cuentos de fantasmas
 2002 – Galia, con quien tanto quería

References

1930 births
2013 deaths
20th-century Uruguayan women writers
20th-century Uruguayan writers
Academic staff of the Catholic University of Uruguay
Uruguayan translators
Writers from Montevideo
20th-century translators